She'eb Subregion is a subregion in the Northern Red Sea region (Zoba Semienawi Keyih Bahri) of Eritrea. Its capital lies at She'eb.

References
Awate.com: Martyr Statistics

Northern Red Sea Region
Subregions of Eritrea